Trécourt is a surname. Notable people with the surname include:

 Claudine Trécourt (born 1962), French ski mountaineer, high mountain guide, and mountain climber
 Giacomo Trecourt (1812–1882), Italian painter
 Sylvie Trécourt (born 1962), French ski mountaineer